Heidrun Bluhm (born 18 January 1958 in Schwerin, Mecklenburg-Vorpommern) is a German politician and member of "Die Linke."

Life 
Since 2005 Bluhm has served as a Member of the Bundestag.
In June 2021, Bluhm announced that she will not seek re-election in 2021 German federal election.

External links 

 Official website 
 Biography by German Bundestag 
 Biography by Die Linke

References 

1958 births
Living people
People from Schwerin
Socialist Unity Party of Germany politicians
Party of Democratic Socialism (Germany) politicians
Members of the Bundestag for Mecklenburg-Western Pomerania
21st-century German women politicians
20th-century German women politicians
Members of the Bundestag 2017–2021
Members of the Bundestag 2013–2017
Members of the Bundestag 2009–2013
Members of the Bundestag 2005–2009
Members of the Bundestag for The Left